The 1950 Iowa State Cyclones football team represented Iowa State College of Agricultural and Mechanic Arts (later renamed Iowa State University) in the Big Seven Conference during the 1950 college football season. In their fourth year under head coach Abe Stuber, the Cyclones compiled a 3–6–1 record (2–3–1 against conference opponents), finished in fifth place in the conference, and were outscored by their opponents by a combined total of 200 to 174. They played their home games at Clyde Williams Field in Ames, Iowa.

The team's regular starting lineup on offense consisted of left end Sy Wilhelmi, left tackle Lowell Titus, left guard Stan Campbell, center Rollie Arns, right guard Bob Matheson, right tackle John Tillo, right end Jim Doran, quarterback Bill Weeks, left halfback Melvin Meling, right halfback Mark Rothacker, and fullback Maury Schnell. Vince Beacom was the team captain.

The team's statistical leaders included Maury Schnell with 490 rushing yards, Bill Weeks with 1,552 passing yards, Jim Doran with 651 receiving yards, and Doran and Weeks with 36 points (six touchdowns) each. Two Iowa State players were selected as first-team all-conference players: Doran and Weeks.

Schedule

References

Iowa State
Iowa State Cyclones football seasons
Iowa State Cyclones football